Anykščiai District Municipality is one of 60 municipalities in Lithuania.

Structure 
District structure:   
 3 cities – Anykščiai, Kavarskas and Troškūnai;
 8 towns – Andrioniškis, Debeikiai, Kurkliai, Skiemonys, Surdegis, Svėdasai, Traupis and Viešintos;
 758 villages.
  
Biggest population (2001):  
Anykščiai – 11958
Svėdasai – 1002
Kavarskas – 809
Naujieji Elmininkai – 696
Troškūnai – 525
Kurkliai – 474
Ažuožeriai – 452
Debeikiai – 452
Aknystos – 441
Raguvėlė – 398

Elderships 
Anykščiai District Municipality is divided into 10 elderships:

References

 
Municipalities of Utena County
Municipalities of Lithuania